The Worcestershire Way is a waymarked long-distance trail within the county of Worcestershire, England. It runs  from Bewdley to Great Malvern.

History

The route and its length were modified in 2004 and it now runs wholly within Worcestershire.

The route

The Worcestershire Way begins in the Georgian town of Bewdley. The official start/end point can be found as a finger post and information board at the side of the River Severn, next to Dog Lane car park.

The route then runs south to Ribbesford and Heightington before passing through woodland on narrow winding lanes down to Abberley Hill. From Abberley Hill the route goes south and up the steep Walsgrove Hill with views over the Teme Valley before continuing south to Ankerdine Hill and the Suckley Hills. From the Suckely Hills the Worcestershire Way heads south-east towards the Malvern Hills. The route over the northern Malvern Hills is way-marked with stone direction markers which can be difficult to find.

The route circles North Hill before making its final descent past St. Ann's Well and finishing in Great Malvern.

The official start/end point can be found as an information board opposite the Post Office on Abbey Road.

Places of interest

The Worcestershire Way passes numerous places of interest, including St Leonard's church in Ribbesford, Abberley Clock Tower,  Birchwood Common (where Sir Edward Elgar composed much of his music), the Malvern Hills and St. Ann's Well.

Circular walks
Official circular walks along the Worcestershire Way include:

Ribbesford Circular Trail
The Abberley Circular Walk
The Martley Circular Walk
Walks on the Northern Malvern Hills

Connecting trails

The Way links with the North Worcestershire Path in the north — which in turn links to the Staffordshire Way.

It also overlaps with the Geopark Way at several points and meets with the Three Choirs Way at Knightwick.

See also
Long-distance footpaths in the United Kingdom

External links
Info from the Ramblers Association
Worcestershire Way - LDWA Long Distance Paths
Off-site Waymarked Circular Walks
Photos of the Worcestershire Way on geograph.org.uk
Abberley and Malvern Hills Geopark

References

Long-distance footpaths in England
Footpaths in Worcestershire
County-themed walking routes in the United Kingdom